In algebraic geometry, given a Deligne–Mumford stack X, a perfect obstruction theory for X consists of:
 a perfect two-term complex  in the derived category  of quasi-coherent étale sheaves on X, and

Examples

Schemes 
Consider a regular embedding  fitting into a cartesian square

where  are smooth. Then, the complex
 (in degrees )
forms a perfect obstruction theory for X. The map comes from the composition

Note that the associated virtual fundamental class is

Example 1 
Consider a smooth projective variety .

and the associated virtual fundamental class is

In particular, if  is a smooth local complete intersection then the perfect obstruction theory is the cotangent complex (which is the same as the truncated cotangent complex).

Deligne–Mumford stacks 
The previous construction works too with Deligne–Mumford stacks.

Symmetric obstruction theory 
By definition, a symmetric obstruction theory is a perfect obstruction theory together with nondegenerate symmetric bilinear form.

Example: Let f be a regular function on a smooth variety (or stack). Then the set of critical points of f carries a symmetric obstruction theory in a canonical way.

Example: Let M be a complex symplectic manifold. Then the (scheme-theoretic) intersection of Lagrangian submanifolds of M carries a canonical symmetric obstruction theory.

Notes

References

See also 
 Behrend function
 Gromov–Witten invariant

Differential topology
Symplectic geometry
Hamiltonian mechanics
Smooth manifolds